The canton of Saint-Étienne-du-Bois is an administrative division of the Ain department, in eastern France. It was created at the French canton reorganisation which came into effect in March 2015. Its seat is in Saint-Étienne-du-Bois.

It consists of the following communes:
 
Beaupont
Bény
Bohas-Meyriat-Rignat
Cize
Coligny
Cormoz
Corveissiat
Courmangoux
Domsure
Drom
Grand-Corent
Hautecourt-Romanèche
Jasseron
Marboz
Meillonnas
Nivigne et Suran
Pirajoux
Pouillat
Ramasse 
Saint-Étienne-du-Bois
Salavre
Simandre-sur-Suran
Val-Revermont
Verjon
Villemotier
Villereversure

References

Cantons of Ain